The Sizaki are a Bantu ethnolinguistic group based in north-western Butiama District of Mara Region of Tanzania, near Lake Victoria.  In 1987 the Sizaki population was estimated to number 82,000 .

Ethnic groups in Tanzania
Indigenous peoples of East Africa